Huang Yen-lin (28 February 1975 – 6 April 2009), better known by her stage name A-Sun (阿桑, a slang term for "old woman" in Taiwanese Hokkien), was a Taiwanese Mandopop singer-songwriter. She died in 2009 from breast cancer, aged 34.

Discography
 Studio albums
 2003 Love Hurts (受了點傷)
 2005 For the Lonely... (寂寞在唱歌)

 Soundtracks and theme songs
TV series featuring her songs include:
 The Rose (2005 Taiwanese series)
 Chinese Paladin (2005 Chinese series)
 The Hospital (2006 Taiwanese series)
 Justice Bao (2010-2012 Chinese series) - the ending theme song of Season 2 (2011) was written by her, and sung by her friend Shane Chang after her death.

Awards and nominations
 2004 15th Golden Melody Awards
 Nominated - Best New Artist, Love Hurts

References
 
 

1975 births
2009 deaths
Deaths from breast cancer
Taiwanese Mandopop singers
Taiwanese songwriters
People from Yunlin County
Women songwriters
Deaths from cancer in Taiwan
20th-century Taiwanese women singers
21st-century Taiwanese women singers